Looking Up is a 2019 Chinese drama film directed by Deng Chao and Baimei Yu. It was written by Baimei Yu, produced by Leng Yi, and starring Deng Chao, Bai Yu, Ren Suxi, Xi Wang, and Xilun Sun.

Looking Up premiered in China on July 18, 2019, and was released in the United States on July 19, 2019.

Plot 
At a press conference for the two astronauts about to go on the Shuguang No. 16 spacecraft – fourth-timer Gu Xinghe (Shao Bing) and first-timer Ma Fei (Bai Yu) – the latter's family is conspicuously not present.

September 1990: as a young boy (Feng Ze’ang) in the city of Dongpei, Ma Fei's father, engineer Ma Haowen (Deng Chao), had given him a globe made from a football. But during a splashy ceremony for the opening of a bridge that Ma Haowen had designed, the bridge had collapsed, tarring Ma Haowen's reputation for ever.

15 December 2019: After 57 days the two astronauts are due to return to Earth in three days’ time. Suddenly, however, all contact is lost with Jiuquan when some space debris damages the spacecraft's radio antenna.

February 1991: Ma Haowen has been convicted of negligence and sent to a remote prison, where his wife Xinyu (Ren Suxi) visits and gets him to sign divorce papers. During his prison sentence Ma Haowen is bullied by fellow convicts; at home, his son Ma Fei is also bullied.

In 1997 Ma Haowen returns home to Dongpei after seven years, still hated by people in the town. Xinyu now has a sugar daddy, railway administrator Meng (Liang Chao), and the two have sent Ma Fei (Sun Xilun) to Boyu High School, an exclusive local boarder that's among the four best in Dongpei. When Ma Fei is expelled for skipping class and reading a Jin Yong martial-arts novel, Ma Haowen publicly challenges the headmaster, Yan (Li Jianyi), over the decision that if he can make his son becomes a top ten student, Yan will overturn his decision to expel him. Yan finally agrees to let Ma Fei stay on for a while, as long as he makes the top 10 in class. When Meng has to go to Guangzhou on business, Ma Haowen spends time with his son but he's still mocked by locals in the street and still can't find a job. One man, Liu Baliang (Wu Yaheng), does give him a job after Ma Haowen helps him out; and Ma Haowen's onetime apprentice, Lu Datou (Wang Ge), surreptitiously gives him and his son a place to stay. In return, Ma Haowen does a lot of work under Lu Datou's name.

With his father's encouragement, Ma Fei starts to study hard, though Xinyu is appalled at what is going on. At the high school, Ma Haowen becomes friendly with Gao Tianxiang (Wang Xi), a young replacement teacher who believes in Ma Fei. Ma Haowen tries to get his son to learn in a lateral way, not just rote from school books, and to open his eyes to the world. He finally pulls him out of high school and educates him on the road, though Ma Fei is almost drowned in a heavy storm that separates the two of them. After a difficult test, Ma Fei failed to score the top ten but Ma Haowen cheered his son up and stated that he still proud of him for trying his best. Gao sneaks in the principal's office and find Ma Fei's essay and persuade the teacher's council to let Ma Fei a chance to read his essay, which she believes to be good enough to give him a top ten position. Eventually, the essay moves the teachers and enable Ma Fei to have a perfect score to be a top ten student, making Yan loses the bet. Outside, an insane man comes and wreck havoc on the school ground and Ma Haowen forces the principal to reveal that the insane man is actually Yan's son who was once a top student but after a failed test, Yan disowned his son. Depressed, the son committed suicide but survived. However, the head injuries from the suicide caused him to become mentally invalid. 

After revealing the truth, Yan breaks down and cries causing everyone to realize that the reason he puts Ma Fei down is to hide his own failure as a father. Ma Haowen then makes the Yan to change his way as his conservative way is the reason why he lost his son. 

Several years later, Ma Fei graduated his school and was accepted in aviation school. While eating at a restaurant, Ma Haowen discovered that Lu Datou was the one behind the collapse of the bridge after eavesdropping him talking with his subordinate. Shocked to realize that the reason why Lu was so nice to him and his son was to avoid suspicion all the time, Haowen breaks into the room and confront Lu. Cornered, Lu reveals that he sabotaged the bridge to gain Haowen's position as chief engineer. Enraged, Haowen beats up Lu and brings him to the court to fully vindicate him after many years.   

16 December 2019: Ma Fei volunteers to go outside the spacecraft to inspect the damaged antenna, without which they cannot return to Earth. Gu Xinghe forbids him, but eventually Ma Fei is to make his own, unconventional decision, as his father has always taught him.

Cast 
 Deng Chao as Ma Haowen
 Bai Yu as Ma Fei (Adult son)
 Ren Suxi as Xinyu
 Wang Xi as Teacher Xiao Gao
 Sun Xilun as Ma Fei (Youth son)
 Li Jianyi as Director Yan
 Chao Liang as Uncle Meng
 Bing Shao as Gu Xinghe
 Ge Wang as Lu Datou
 Yaheng Wu as Liu Baliang
 Zun Wei as Fengzi
 Zeang Feng as Ma Fei (Childhood son)
 Zhidi Bai Ma as Fei's high school teacher
 Lele Dai Gu as Xinghe's wife
 Jing Wu as Pan Wanli

Music 
Steffen Thum's score was recorded at Synchron Stage in Vienna.

Release and promotion 
The film was released on July 24, 2019, and featured at the 2019 Busan International Film Festival.

References

External links 
 
 Looking Up at Rotten Tomatoes

2019 films
2010s mystery drama films
Chinese mystery drama films
2019 drama films
Films about astronauts